The Patapat Viaduct, also known as Patapat Bridge, is a viaduct at the municipality of Pagudpud, Ilocos Norte, a coastal resort town on the northernmost tip of Luzon Island in the Philippines.

The bridge is elevated  over sea level. The viaduct was constructed by Hanil Development Co. Ltd. under the overall management of DPWH-PMO-PJHK and was completed and opened to traffic in October 1986. It rises along the town's coastal mountains, which is the starting point of the Cordillera Mountain Range that snakes through Northern Luzon. It is the 4th longest bridge in the Philippines.

References

External links

http://www.waypoints.ph/detail_gen.html?wpt=patapt
http://www.yodisphere.com/2011/06/patapat-viaduct-and-kalbario-patapat.html

Bridges in the Philippines
Buildings and structures in Ilocos Norte